Eskişehir Air Base  is a military airport in the city of Eskişehir, Turkey.

Military usage
Eskişehir Air Base is home to the 1st Air Wing (Ana Jet Üs or AJÜ) of the 1st Air Force Command (Hava Kuvvet Komutanlığı) of the Turkish Air Force (Türk Hava Kuvvetleri). Other wings of this command are located in Konya (LTAN), Ankara Akıncı (LTAE), Bandırma (LTBG) and Balıkesir (LTBF). The 1st Air Wing operate 2 squadrons (filo) of F-4E Phantom from this airbase. These are 111 Filo and 112 Filo.113 Filo operating RF-4E has been disbanded.

Accidents and incidents
On 1 August 1994, Douglas C-47A 6041 of Turkish Air Force was written off after an accident at Eskişehir Air Base.

See also
 Hasan Polatkan Airport

References

External links

Airports in Turkey
Turkish Air Force bases